Bryce Thomas Hubbart (born June 28, 2001) is an American professional baseball pitcher in the Cincinnati Reds organization.

Amateur career
Hubbart attended Windermere High School in Orlando, Florida. As a senior in 2019, he went 9-0 with a 0.73 ERA and 96 strikeouts over  innings. He went unselected in the 2019 Major League Baseball draft and enrolled at Florida State University to play college baseball.

As a freshman at Florida State in 2020, Hubbart pitched  innings in which he gave up six earned runs, eight walks, and compiled 13 strikeouts before the remainder of the season was cancelled due to the COVID-19 pandemic. That summer, he played collegiate summer baseball with the Winter Garden Squeeze of the Florida Collegiate Summer League. In 2021, Hubbart appeared in 16 games (making 14 starts) in which he went 6-5 with a 3.80 ERA and 94 strikeouts over 71 innings. After the season, he played in the Cape Cod Baseball League with the Brewster Whitecaps, where he posted an 0.87 ERA and 45 strikeouts over 31 innings and earned All-Star honors. Hubbart entered the 2022 season as a top prospect for the upcoming draft. He was named Florida State's number two starter behind Parker Messick. In his first start of the season versus the James Madison Dukes, he threw five scoreless innings in which he walked zero batters while striking out 13. He was subsequently named the Atlantic Coast Conference Pitcher of the Week. At the end of the regular season, he was named to the All-ACC Second Team. Over 15 starts, he went 8-3 with a 3.32 ERA and 96 strikeouts over 76 innings. Following the season's end, he traveled to San Diego where he participated in the Draft Combine.

Professional career
Hubbart was drafted by the Cincinnati Reds in the third round with the 94th overall selection of the 2022 Major League Baseball draft. He signed with the team for $520,500.

Hubbart made his professional debut with the Arizona Complex League Reds and was later promoted to the Daytona Tortugas. Over  innings, he gave up one run while striking out 12 batters and walking six.

References

External links
Florida State Seminoles bio

2001 births
Living people
Baseball players from Florida
Baseball players from Orlando, Florida
Baseball pitchers
Florida State Seminoles baseball players
Brewster Whitecaps players
Arizona Complex League Reds players
Daytona Tortugas players